North Peak is a summit in the U.S. state of Nevada.

North Peak was named for the fact it is north of other nearby mountains.

References

Mountains of Clark County, Nevada